Kotha Bujurg is a village in Gogawan tehsil in the Khargone district (previously known as West Nimar) of Madhya Pradesh, India. It belongs to the Indore division.

References

Cities and towns in Khargone district